9 Nelalu or Tommidi Nelalu is a 2000 Telugu-language drama film directed by Kranthi Kumar. The film stars Soundarya and Vikram. The film opened to positive reviews from critics. The film was later re-shot and released in Tamil as Kanden Seethaiyai due to Vikram's newfound popularity post-Sethu.  The film was premiered retrospective at the Toronto International Film Festival. The director shot the film in 15 days. Noted director V. V. Vinayak worked as an assistant director for this film. The film was a box office flop although Soundarya's performance was praised.

Plot 
The film revolves around Savitri (Soundarya), an innocent simple and loving orphan, and Surendra (Vikram), an intelligent computer programmer. When Savitri has a marriage arranged with a drunkard, Surendra stops this alliance and graciously agreed to marry her.

However, trouble starts when Surendra's brainchild, a virtual reality program on temples of South India is sabotaged, and he is accused of selling out to a rival company. Disillusioned by the sudden turn of events, he crashes into a truck and sustains a serious head injury that requires a major operation.

Savitri finds herself deserted by all her well-wishers when it comes to financial help, and her husband's life hangs in the balance. A lady doctor suggests that she become pregnant through artificial insemination for a rich man, whose wife is impotent, in exchange for monetary remuneration. Savitri agrees and the rest of the film is based on the social stigma attached to artificial insemination and surrogate motherhood.

Cast 

 Soundarya as Savitri
 Vikram as Surendra
 Nutan Prasad as Judge
 Tanikella Bharani as Lawyer
 Narra Venkateswara Rao
 M. S. Narayana
 L. B. Sriram
 Raghunatha Reddy
 Sudha as Surendra's mother
Padma
 Dharmavarapu Subramanyam
 Dr. Nagesh
 Gundu Sudarshan
 Uttej

Tamil version
Vivek as Indrajith
Mayilsamy as Guduvancheri Govindasamy

Production 
A. R. Rahman was initially signed on to score the film's music, but he later opted out owing to creative differences. Later V. S. Udhaya replaced him as music director. Soundarya dubbed her own voice for her character in the movie.

Release 
The film opened to very positive reviews with a critic noting that "in short, this is cinema at its best" and that "the script is smooth flowing and engrossing" and that "it leaves you with a thought and a sense of pride in Indian cinema. Whether it will go down well with the masses is doubtful as there are no songs, action or cheap comedy, which might be a bitter pill to swallow for most". In regard to performances, the critic notes that Soundarya "excels in her role and that her expressions, body language and dialogue delivery fit her role like a glove" and that "Vikram has given a controlled performance as the troubled, confused, yet loving husband". The film was later re-shot and released in Tamil as Kanden Seethaiyai with a comedy track separately shot with Vivek, Chaplin Balu, Kullamani, and Mayilsamy added in.

References

External links 
 

2000 films
2000s Telugu-language films
Indian pregnancy films
Indian drama films
2000 drama films
Films directed by Kranthi Kumar